During the 1990–91 season, Newcastle United participated in the Football League Second Division.

Season Synopsis
After the disappointment of the previous season to gain promotion at the first attempt, the Magpies started the new season slowly. Injuries to key players Mark McGhee and John Gallagher did little to help manager Jim Smith's cause and, after a tussle with the board, Smith left the club in early 1991, branding the club 'unmanageable'. He was replaced as manager by former Tottenham and Argentina player Ossie Ardiles. With the change of manager came a change of style, in came a passing game where the ball rarely left the ground replacing the more direct style. It also marked the appearance of several promising youngsters who were bloodied at the expense of older experienced professionals, those to get their first break in the professional game were Steve Watson, Alan Thompson and Robbie Elliott. Along with the likes of established youngsters Lee Clark and Steve Howey the future seemed to be bright, however the gap between Newcastle and the top teams was too much to be breached and the team finished mid-table.

Appearances, goals and cards
(Substitute appearances in brackets)

Coaching staff

External links
Newcastle United Football Club - Fixtures 1990-91
Season Details - 1990-91 - toon1892

Newcastle United F.C. seasons
Newcastle United